The Dufferin Street bridges are two inter-connected vehicular bridges in Toronto, Ontario, Canada. The bridges carry Dufferin Street over a railway corridor and the Gardiner Expressway to Exhibition Place. The bridges closed to vehicular traffic in 2013. Temporary structures were built in 2013-2014 to allow a resumption of traffic in early 2014. As of March 2019 the spans over the Gardiner Expressway remain in place and the bailey bridges replacing the older outer pedestrian bridges of the northern span with the inner vehicular steel plate box girder bridge still in place.

North span 
The truss bridge is a  steel truss bridge, built from 1911 to 1912 to cross over railway tracks south of Springhurst Avenue. Four tracks pass under the bridge. A 2013 engineering study determined that the bridge was unsafe and not viable to be repaired. However, in 2014, Bailey bridges were added for pedestrian traffic on the east and west sides, while the inner steel plate box girder bridge for vehicular traffic remains in place.

South span 
The south span is a  concrete overpass built in 1958 after demolition of the old Dufferin Gate to allow for clearance for the Gardiner Expressway below.

Deterioration and replacement 
After a report from external inspections conducted in 2007 the city decided to replace both spans with a single span:

 1911 steel plate girder bridge over rail corridor is structurally unsafe for vehicular traffic
 lack space below to expanded rail corridor
 need to provide space for future LRT corridor to the south end of the bridge
 1958 concrete bridge over Gardiner Expressway needs maintenance to keep it structurally safe
 eliminate the existing  gap between the two existing bridges spans

From June 2013 the bridges have been closed to vehicular traffic. In November 2013-early 2014, the north bridge superstructure were replaced by three temporary bridges - two for traffic, and a third for pedestrians. The temporary bridges were opened in 2014 and are still used as of September 11, 2021. 

Toronto tried deciding the type of bridge that will span over the tracks, but the decision was canceled as of September 11, 2021.   The four types were:

 Steel plate box girder
 Hung arch
 Cable stay
 Concrete box girder

Gallery

References 

Bridges in Toronto
Road bridges in Ontario
Bridges completed in 1912
1912 establishments in Ontario